Coppinger is a surname of Norse origin historically associated with Ireland and the counties of Suffolk and Kent in England, and the seaboard of Northern France.

While there are various spellings in historical documents, after more standardised spellings became established in the C18th the main variant was between Coppinger and Copinger. Whether an individual chose to use one or two ps seems to have been a question of personal preference which thereafter became a fixed tradition in their descendants.

Notable people
Notable people with the surname include:

Barry Coppinger, British politician
Charles Coppinger (1851–1877), English cricketer
Captain Cuthbert Coppinger, DSC, Royal Navy, Hero of the Battle of Jutland.
Edward Coppinger (1846–1927), English cricketer
George Coppinger Ashlin (1837–1921), Irish architect
James Coppinger (born 1981), English professional footballer
John W. Coppinger (1852–1900), American politician and lawyer
José María Coppinger, prominent Cuban soldier and governor
Marion Coppinger, wife of  Charles Howard, 11th Duke of Norfolk, (17??-1768). Died in childbirth.
Maurice Coppinger (1727-1802), Irish barrister and politician
Richard William Coppinger (1847–1910), British naval surgeon and naturalist
Rocky Coppinger (born 1974), Major League Baseball player
Ruth Coppinger,  Irish Socialist Party politician for Dublin West
Septimus Coppinger (1828-1870), English cricketer
Sir Walter Coppinger (died 1639), Irish noble
Walter Arthur Copinger (1847-1910), English lawyer & author, hymn writer, co-founder of the Bibliographical Society, London, and Angel in the Catholic Apostolic Church
William Coppinger (1849–1877), English cricketer
William Coppinger (bishop), Irish bishop

References

History of the Copingers or Coppingers; W. A. Copinger; new enlarged ed. 1884 (traces the descent of the author's family from the Danes in the tenth century, when they appear to have settled in Suffolk and in the south of Ireland).

See also 
Copine, group of human proteins
Coppinger's Court, a ruined fortified house near Rosscarbery in Ireland
Cruel Coppinger, a semi-legendary figure in Cornish folklore
Glenville, County Cork, the main Coppinger estate in the eighteenth century 
Radiodiscus coppingers, a species of gastropod in the family Charopidae; found in Argentina, Brazil, and Chile

English-language surnames
Surnames of British Isles origin